Sherif Sonbol  (born December 6, 1956) is an Egyptian photographer specializing in architecture, scenic fine arts and photojournalism.

Early life 
Sonbol was born in Giza, Cairo, Egypt.

He studied insurance at Cairo University and attended the Chartered Insurance Institute in London. He worked for the Egyptian Reinsurance Company as a marine underwriter. Around 1988 Sonbol decided to pursue one of his passions -photography- and tried his luck at Al-Ahram, where he soon started working as a freelancer.

Career 
It only took a few months for him to become a full-time photographer at Al-Ahram under the auspices of Antoun Albert.

Although achieving professional goals and popularity at Al-Ahram, at a certain point Sonbol saw the need of leaving the newspaper in order to be recruited by the American Embassy's as official photographer. This position was finally not materialized but still the American Embassy incorporated him to its computer department as graphic designer and computer trainer for newcomers,

He managed to combine these roles with his work in the New Cairo Opera House, where he had been taking pictures since it opened its doors in 1988. Eventually Sonbol resigned his place at the American Embassy and returned to Al-Ahram; this time to the Al-Ahram Weekly.

He stayed six years as main photographer of Kalam-El-Nass. On his last year there, the Maraya-El-Nass magazine project saw the light. This was an interior design magazine belonging to the same group as Kalam-El-Nass. The project's key artistic responsibles were to be writer Moguib Rushdi and himself, so he was fully transferred to the new magazine. Here too he managed to "shake the foundations of Egyptian interior photography with his use of natural light".

Currently Sonbol manages to combine his responsibilities as chief photographer in Al-Ahram Weekly    and in the Cairo Opera House  with other projects. As a freelancer, he occasionally contributes to other publications -including Kalam-El-Nass-. He participates in photography campaigns and other job assignments too. He has also collaborated with important cultural centers such as the Bibliotheca Alexandrina. His work has been displayed in various exhibits  worldwide and has been the subject of doctorate thesis

He has given seminars at AFCA (Académie Francophone Cairote des Arts) and teaches photography at the Ahram Canadian University  since 2008.

Through one of his most recent freelance projects, Sonbol tries to bring Western and Arabic cultures closer together in order to promote a better understanding and communication.

Technique and style 

One of Sonbol's trademarks is his use of natural available light; a technique he developed under the encouragement of Antoun Albert.
An acute sense of timing is also characteristic of his images. This is especially evident in his ballet shots and The New York Times referred to it as "a particular agile eye" adding that "Even when Sonbol concentrates on stillness, he exemplifies Martha Graham's adage that a pause is not a pose but "an act of accomplishment" ". Sonbol developed his eye for dance under the supervision of Erminia Gambarelli Kamel, former prima ballerina and currently artistic director of the Cairo Opera House Ballet.

Critical reception 
"Nothing is more beautiful than to express art through art…" -Naguib Mahfouz, Nobel Laureate
"Rare is the photographer who looks at a familiar art form and shows it in a new light. But Sherif Sonbol’s stunning and revelatory dance photographs [show] a particularly agile eye… apt to shoot from a catwalk above the stage or from the wings, frequently abstracting shapes into dynamic and explosive bursts of color." -Anna Kisselgoff, New York Times
"An artist has reached the pinnacle of his profession when his work can be recognised without his signature being written…" -Mounir Kenaan, leading Egyptian painterIn 2001, Mounir Kenaan wrote: “A real artist is when you can recognize his work, without seeing his signature. Sonbol’s photos are like that. When I see a photo taken by Sherif Sonbol, I know immediately it’s his, without seeing his name. He surpassed the impossible. Sonbol, whose endless passion and near-obsession for learning, it is no wonder that he is now the “master’ of all photography masters in ballet – " Al Masry Al Youm English edition article "The Camera Dancer"

Books

 Opera 1988–1993, (Cairo Opera House 1993)
 Aida, (Cairo Opera House 1999)
 Pharaohs of the Sun: Akhenaten : Nefertiti : Tutankhamen, (Bullfinch & Boston Museum for Fine Arts 1999,  &  ) Contributor.
 Swan Lake for Children, (Cairo Opera House, 2000)
 Mulid! Carnivals of Faith, (AUC, 2001,   &  )
 Mamluk Art: The Splendor and Magic of the Sultans (Museum with No Frontiers & Transatlantic, 2001,  & )
 The Pharaohs, (Bompiani Arte & Thames and Hudson, 2002) Main contributor.
 Der Turmbau Zu Babel – Ursprung und Vielfalt von Sprache und Schrift (Kunsthistorisches Museum Wien & Skira, 2003,   &  ) Contributor.
 40 Pyramids of Egypt and their neighbors, (Cyperus, 2005)
 40 Pyramids of Egypt and their neighbors, Arabic version (Al Hayaa Al Masriya Al-Aama Lel Ketab, 2005)
 Egyptian Palaces and Villas, (Abrams Inc & AUC, 2006,   &  )
 The Churches of Egypt: From the Journey of the Holy Family to the Present Day, (AUC, 2007,  & ). Second edition, AUC, 2012
 Arts of the City Victorious (Yale University, 2008,   &  ) Main contributor.
 Christianity and Monasticism in Wadi al-Natrun: Essays from the 2002 International Symposium of the Saint Mark Foundation and the Saint Shenouda the Archimandrite Coptic Society, Edited by Maged S.A. Mikhail & Mark Moussa, (AUC, 2009) Cover image.
 Opera 1988–2008 (Cairo Opera House, 2009) 
 Al-Tahra Palace, A Gem in a Majestic Garden (CULTNAT / Bibliotheca Alexandrina, 2009)
 The Nile Cruise, an Illustrated Journey (AUC, 2010,  &  )
 Wonders of the Horus Temple: The Sound and Light of Edfu (AUC, 2011,  & ). Introduction by Zahi Hawass
 The History and Religious Heritage of Old Cairo: Its Fortress, Churches, Synagogue, and Mosque  (AUC, 2013,   &  )

References

External links 
Sherif Sonbol website
 Al Ahram Weekly
Ahram Online
Cairo Opera House

1956 births
Photographers from Cairo
Architectural photographers
Egyptian photojournalists
People from Giza
Living people
Egyptian contemporary artists
Cairo University alumni